Henry Hunter may refer to:

Henry Hunter (RAF officer) (1893–1966)
Henry Hunter (actor), American actor
Henry Hunter (Home and Away), a fictional character in the Australian soap opera Home and Away
Henry Hunter (divine) (1741–1802), minister who translated Leonard Euler and Johann Kaspar Lavater
Henry Hunter (architect) (1832–1892), Tasmanian architect

See also
Harry Hunter (disambiguation)